Vitaly Afanasevich Petrov (born 6 October 1945 in Donetsk) is a Ukrainian athletics coach, mainly specialising in pole vault. He was the coach of legendary pole vaulters, like Sergey Bubka, Yelena Isinbayeva and Giuseppe Gibilisco. All three were world champions, with the first two also winning Olympic gold medals and setting world records.

Biography

Vitaly Petrov was the first coach of the Ukrainian Sergey Bubka, which he took in technique foster care in 1974, when Bubka was just eleven years old. The relationship was broken on June 16, 1990 after 16 years of collaboration. He has also coached the Italian Giuseppe Gibilisco (2003-2007 and 2011) and  the Russian Yelena Isinbayeva (2005-2010). He was main coach of the Pole vault Centre in Formia, Italy.

In 2007 he received the award from International Association of Athletics Federations the IAAF Coaches Award for his achievements with Isinbayeva. In 2010 he started to coached in Italy the Brazilian pole vaulter Fabiana Murer, she became the fourth pole vaulter brought to World Championships to Petrov.

Technique
Petrov's innovation in the pole vault was the swing of the vaulter's legs later into the vault, thus retaining more of the energy and depending less on the recoil effect of the bent pole.

Achievements

References

External links
 Coach profile at IAAF web site
 Vitaly Petrov's Vault Model 

Ukrainian athletics coaches
1938 births
Living people
Sportspeople from Donetsk